JSW may refer to:
 JSW Group, an Indian business conglomerate
 J. S. Wilson (1888-1969), prominent figure in the Scout movement worldwide, and contemporary of Lord Baden-Powell
 Japan Steel Works
 James Smith-Williams (born 1997), American football player
 Jastrzębska Spółka Węglowa, a Polish coal mining company
 Jet Set Willy, a 1984 computer game
 Journal of the Southwest
 Japanische Schule in Wien (Japanese School of Vienna)